Michał Garbocz (born March 12, 1973) is a Polish former professional ice hockey forward.

Garbocz played in the Polska Hokej Liga for KKH Katowice, TH Unia Oświęcim and GKS Tychy. He also played in the French Ligue Magnus for Anglet Hormadi Élite from 2001 to 2007. He also played in the 2002 World Ice Hockey Championships for Poland.

He is the younger brother of Dariusz Garbocz who played in the 1992 Winter Olympics for Poland.

References

External links

1973 births
Living people
Anglet Hormadi Élite players
GKS Katowice (ice hockey) players
Polish ice hockey forwards
Sportspeople from Katowice
GKS Tychy (ice hockey) players
TH Unia Oświęcim players